Aaron of Aleth (died after 552), also called Saint Aihran or Eran in Breton, was a sixth-century hermit, monk and abbot at a monastery on Cézembre, a small island near Aleth, opposite Saint-Malo in Brittany, France. Some sources suggest he may have migrated from Celtic Britain to take up residence in Armorican Domnonia.

He lived alone near Lamballe and Pleumeur-Gautier, before finally settling on an island separated from the settlement of Aleth. He attracted many visitors while there, including Malo, it is said, in 544, and became their abbot. He died soon afterwards. Malo then succeeded to the spiritual rule of the district subsequently known as Saint-Malo, and was consecrated first Bishop of Aleth. Aaron's feast day is 21 June (at Saint-Malo) or 22 June (elsewhere). He is mentioned in Les Vies des Saints de Bretagne.

The town of Saint-Aaron in Lamballe, France is named after him.

See also

 List of Catholic saints
 Julian Maunoir, "Apostle of

Notes

Sources

 
  (contains a reference to Aaron)
 Catholic Forum
 Holweck, F. G. A Biographical Dictionary of the Saints. St. Louis, MO: B. Herder Book Co. (1924)

Date of birth unknown
Date of death unknown
Medieval Breton saints
Medieval Welsh saints
French hermits
French abbots
6th-century Breton people
6th-century Christian saints
Welsh hermits